The 2021–22 UEFA Europa League qualifying phase and play-off round began on 3 August and ended on 26 August 2021.

A total of 28 teams competed in the qualifying system of the 2021–22 UEFA Europa League, which includes the qualifying phase, with 10 teams in Champions Path and six teams in Main Path, and the play-off round. The 10 winners in the play-off round advanced to the group stage, to join the 12 teams that enter in the group stage, the six losers of the Champions League play-off round (four from Champions Path and two from League Path), and the four League Path losers of the Champions League third qualifying round.

Times were CEST (UTC+2), as listed by UEFA (local times, if different, were in parentheses).

Teams
In the third qualifying round, the teams are divided into two paths:
Champions Path (10 teams): 10 teams which enter this round (10 losers of the Champions League Champions Path second qualifying round).
Main Path (6 teams): 6 teams which enter this round (including 3 losers of the Champions League League Path second qualifying round).

The winners of the third qualifying round are combined into a single path for the play-off round:
Play-off round (20 teams): 12 teams which enter this round (including 6 losers of the Champions League Champions Path third qualifying round), and 8 winners of the third qualifying round.

All teams eliminated from the qualifying phase and play-off round enter the Europa Conference League:
The 5 losers of the Champions Path third qualifying round enter the Champions Path play-off round.
The 3 losers of the Main Path third qualifying round enter the Main Path play-off round.
The 10 losers of the play-off round enter the group stage.

Below are the participating teams (with their 2021 UEFA club coefficients, not to be used as seeding for qualifying phase and play-off round, however), grouped by their starting rounds.

Notes

Format
Each tie is played over two legs, with each team playing one leg at home. The team that scores more goals on aggregate over the two legs advance to the next round. If the aggregate score is level at the end of normal time of the second leg, the away goals rule is no longer applied starting from this season. To decide the winner of the tie, extra time is played, and if the same amount of goals are scored by both teams during extra time, the tie is decided by a penalty shoot-out.

Schedule
The schedule of the competition is as follows (all draws are held at the UEFA headquarters in Nyon, Switzerland).

Third qualifying round

The draw for the third qualifying round was held on 19 July 2021, 13:00 CEST.

Seeding
A total of 16 teams played in the third qualifying round. They were divided into two paths:
Champions Path (10 teams): 10 losers of the 2021–22 UEFA Champions League second qualifying round (Champions Path), whose identity was not known at the time of draw. There was no seeding. Due to political reasons, teams from Azerbaijan and Armenia could not be drawn against each other, thus the losers of the ties between Neftçi Baku/Olympiacos and Alashkert/Sheriff Tiraspol could not be drawn against each other.
Main Path (6 teams): The teams were seeded as following:
Seeded: 3 teams which entered in this round.
Unseeded: 3 losers of the 2021–22 UEFA Champions League second qualifying round (League Path), whose identity was not known at the time of draw. Teams from the same association could not be drawn against each other, thus the following teams could not be drawn against each other:
Scotland: St Johnstone and the loser of the tie between Celtic/Midtjylland
Czech Republic: Jablonec and the loser of the tie between Sparta Prague/Rapid Wien
The first team drawn in each tie would be the home team of the first leg.

Summary

The first legs were played on 3 and 5 August, and the second legs were played on 10 and 12 August 2021.

The winners of the ties advanced to the play-off round. The losers were transferred to the Europa Conference League play-off round of their respective path.

|+Champions Path

|}

|+Main Path

|}

Champions Path

2–2 on aggregate. Omonia won 5–4 on penalties.

Mura won 1–0 on aggregate.

Alashkert won 3–2 on aggregate.

Slovan Bratislava won 4–2 on aggregate.

HJK won 5–2 on aggregate.

Main Path

Celtic won 7–2 on aggregate.

Rapid Wien won 4–2 on aggregate.

Galatasaray won 5–3 on aggregate.

Play-off round

The draw for the play-off round was held on 2 August 2021, 13:00 CEST.

Seeding
A total of 20 teams played in the play-off round. The teams were seeded into four "priority groups":
Priority 1: 6 teams which entered in this round.
Priority 2: 6 losers of the 2021–22 UEFA Champions League third qualifying round (Champions Path), whose identity was not known at the time of the draw
Priority 3: 5 winners of the third qualifying round (Champions Path), whose identity was not known at the time of the draw
Priority 4: 3 winners of the third qualifying round (Main Path), whose identity was not known at the time of the draw
The procedure of the draw was as follows:
The three teams of priority 4 were drawn against teams of priority 1 to produce three ties, until there were no more teams of priority 4 left.
The remaining three teams of priority 1 were drawn against teams of priority 3 to produce three ties, until there were no more teams of priority 1 left.
The remaining two teams of priority 3 were drawn against teams of priority 2 to produce two ties, until there were no more teams of priority 3 left.
The remaining four teams of priority 2 were drawn against each other to produce two ties.
There was no country protection for this round, thus teams from the same association could be drawn against each other. The first team drawn in each tie would be the home team of the first leg.

Summary

The first legs were played on 17, 18 and 19 August, and the second legs were played on 26 August 2021.

The winners of the ties advanced to the group stage. The losers were transferred to the Europa Conference League group stage.

|}

Matches

Galatasaray won 3–2 on aggregate.

Rapid Wien won 6–2 on aggregate.

Celtic won 3–2 on aggregate.

Fenerbahçe won 6–2 on aggregate.

Sturm Graz won 5–1 on aggregate.

4–4 on aggregate. Royal Antwerp won 3–2 on penalties.

Olympiacos won 5–2 on aggregate.

Rangers won 1–0 on aggregate.

Legia Warsaw won 4–3 on aggregate.

Red Star Belgrade won 6–1 on aggregate.

Notes

References

External links

1
August 2021 sports events in Europe
UEFA Europa League qualifying rounds